
Rudolf Demetrovics (19 September 1914 – 2 March 1993), also known as Rudolf Demetrovici, Rudolf Deményi or Rezső Deményi, was a Romanian footballer of Hungarian descent, who played as a midfielder.

Debuted in football by the legendary club Chinezul Timișoara, Demetrovics was an important player of the golden team of Venus București, club with which he won two national titles. Subsequently, he moved to Nagyváradi AC and won another title, this time in Hungary, being again an important pillar in a team of legend, 1943–1944 generation of NAC, first squad outside Budapest which was crowned as champion of Hungary.

After World War II he ended up in Germany, where he played for MTV Ingolstadt in the highest Bavarian amateur League, the Bayernliga, which was then part of the national second tier of German football. In 1948/49 he played for one season for SpVgg Fürth which then played in the Oberliga Süd, the part of the first tier of Germany, where the club got relegated. After this he returned for one season to Ingolstadt.

Demetrovics then migrated to Australia. He was married and had a daughter and a son.

International career
Rudolf Demetrovics played at international level in 8 matches for Romania.

Honours
Venus București
Divizia A: 1938–39, 1939–40
Cupa României: Runner-up 1939–40

Nagyváradi AC
Nemzeti Bajnokság I: 1943–44

MTV Ingolstadt
Bavarian Cup: Runner-up 1947

References

External links
 
 
 Rudolf Demetrovics, Kleeblatt-Chronik

1914 births
1993 deaths
People from Paks
Romanian sportspeople of Hungarian descent
Romanian footballers
Romania international footballers
Association football midfielders
Liga I players
Venus București players
CA Oradea players
Romanian expatriate footballers
Romanian expatriate sportspeople in Germany
Expatriate footballers in Germany
Romanian expatriate sportspeople in Australia